John Goodrich may refer to:
 John Goodrich (Loyalist) (1722–1785), Virginia-born British planter, merchant shipper, and privateer
 John Z. Goodrich (1804–1885), member of the U.S. House of Representatives from Massachusetts
 John F. Goodrich (1887–1937), American screenwriter